"Weak Heart" is a song by Swedish singer Zara Larsson from her debut studio album, 1. The single peaked at number 53 in Sweden, becoming her first to miss the top 30 and is her only single not to achieve any accreditation.

In a review of the album, the track was highlighted as being a touching and more emotional track.

Chart performance
This song debuted at number 53 in Sweden and spent four weeks on that chart.

Music video
The official music video was directed by David Soutar and released on 5 December 2014. The video sees Larsson riding a horse.

Track listing

Weekly charts

Release history

References

2014 songs
2015 singles
Zara Larsson songs
Songs written by Robert Habolin
Songs written by Marcus Sepehrmanesh
Song recordings produced by Elof Loelv